Blendville is a neighborhood of Joplin, Missouri.

History
Blendville was originally called Blend City, and under the latter name was founded in the 1870s, and named for ore blending near the original town site. A post office called Blendsville was established in 1890, and remained in operation until 1900. The community was annexed to Joplin in 1892.

References

Joplin, Missouri